Ch'ŏnnae County is a kun, or county, in Kangwŏn province, North Korea.  Originally part of Munch'ŏn, it was made a separate county as part of the general reorganization of local government in December 1952.

Physical features
Ch'ŏnnae borders the Sea of Japan (East Sea of Korea) to the east. Most of the terrain is mountainous, but there is level ground near the coast in the northeast. The chief stream is the Ch'ŏnt'an River (천탄강).  The county's area is roughly 70% forestland.

Administrative divisions
Ch'ŏnnae county is divided into 1 ŭp (town), 3 rodongjagu (workers' districts) and 15 ri (villages):

Economy

Agriculture
In the northeast, the dominant industry is agriculture. The chief local crops are rice, maize, and soybeans; sericulture (silk farming) and orcharding also play a role.

Mining
Mines extract local mineral deposits including limestone and anthracite.

Transport
The Kangwŏn Line of the Korean State Railway runs through Ch'ŏnnae county, with a short branchline connecting Ch'ŏnnae-ŭp to the mainline. The county is also served by roads.

See also
Geography of North Korea
Administrative divisions of North Korea

References

External links

Counties of Kangwon Province (North Korea)